Caloptilia agrifoliella is a moth of the family Gracillariidae. It is known from the United States (California). The larvae feed on Quercus agrifolia. They mine the leaves of their host plant.

References

External links
mothphotographersgroup

agrifoliella
Moths of North America
Moths described in 1971